Jalan Gua Kelam (Perlis state route R13) is a major road in Perlis, Malaysia.

List of junctions

See also
 Transport in Malaysia

Roads in Perlis